Marc Ó Cathasaigh (born 3 January 1977) is an Irish Green Party politician who has been a Teachta Dála (TD) for the Waterford constituency since the 2020 general election.

He was a member of Waterford City and County Council for the Tramore local electoral area from 2019 to 2020. Laura Swift was co-opted to his seat on the council following his election to the Dáil.

He was a primary school teacher at Glór na Mara in Tramore and the chair of the Waterford Cycling Campaign.

Early life and education
Ó Cathasaigh is from Butlerstown. He graduated with a Bachelor of Arts in English and Philosophy and a Master of Arts in Old and Middle English, both from University College Cork. He then went on to study to become a Primary Teacher at the Marino Institute of Education.

Personal life
He lives in Tramore, County Waterford, with his wife Róisín and their three sons.

References

External links
Green Party profile

Living people
1977 births
Alumni of Marino Institute of Education
Alumni of University College Cork
Local councillors in County Waterford
Members of the 33rd Dáil
Politicians from County Waterford
Green Party (Ireland) TDs